Klootch Canyon, originally Klootchman Canyon, is a canyon on the Skeena River in northwestern British Columbia, Canada, south of the community of Cedarvale.

"Klootchman" is the Chinook Jargon word for "woman" or "female" (i.e. as an adjective).

See also
List of Chinook Jargon placenames

References

Canyons and gorges of British Columbia
Skeena Country
Chinook Jargon place names